The Lawrence Bridge is a historic structure located in Jackson Junction, Iowa, United States. This bridge was designed, fabricated and built by the Wrought Iron Bridge Company of Canton, Ohio for $2,519.35. This and the Upper Bluffton Bridge were built at the same time, and it marked the first time that Winneshiek County had longer-span trusses built at rural river crossings instead of the smaller bowstring truss bridges. This bridge was listed on the National Register of Historic Places in 1998. It is now privately owned, and located on an abandoned portion of 336th Avenue over the Little Turkey River.

References

Bridges completed in 1880
Bridges in Winneshiek County, Iowa
National Register of Historic Places in Winneshiek County, Iowa
Road bridges on the National Register of Historic Places in Iowa
Truss bridges in Iowa
Wrought iron bridges in the United States
Pratt truss bridges in the United States